Avenavirus is a genus of viruses, in the family Tombusviridae. Plants serve as natural hosts. There is only one species in this genus: Oat chlorotic stunt virus.

Structure
Viruses in Avenavirus are non-enveloped, with icosahedral and spherical geometries, and T=3 symmetry. The diameter is around 28-34 nm. Genomes are linear, around 4.1kb in length.

Life cycle
Viral replication is cytoplasmic. Entry into the host cell is achieved by penetration into the host cell. Replication follows the positive stranded RNA virus replication model. Positive stranded RNA virus transcription, using the premature termination model of subgenomic RNA transcription is the method of transcription. Translation takes place by suppression of termination. The virus exits the host cell by tubule-guided viral movement. Plants serve as the natural host. Transmission routes are mechanical, seed borne, and contact.

References

External links
 Viralzone: Avenavirus
 ICTV

Tombusviridae
Virus genera